The Mirpur Khas–Nawabshah Railway  (Sindhi: ميرپور خاص ـ نواب شاھ ريلوي لائين) was one of several branch lines in Pakistan, operated and maintained by Pakistan Railways. The line was unique in that it was one of the few  Metre gauge railways in the region. The line began at Mirpur Khas Junction and ended at Nawabshah Junction.

History

Following the completion of the Hyderabad–Jodhpur Railway in 1892, and its subsequent conversion from broad gauge to metre gauge in 1901, plans to extend the metre gauge network through Sindh were proposed. In 1909, the metre gauge railway was extended from Mirpur Khas northwards to Nawabshah and southwards to Jhudo. The railway reached Khadro in 1912 and Nawabshah in 1939. The railway heavily used for freight transport, most of which was cotton, fresh vegetables and large quantities of red chilies.

Closure
The railway continued to operate through the 1990s despite degradation of the line and was closed in February 2005.

Stations
The stations on this line are as follows:

See also
 Railway lines in Pakistan

References

Closed railway lines in Pakistan
Railway stations on Mirpur Khas–Nawabshah Branch Line
Railway lines opened in 1912
Railway lines closed in 2005
Metre gauge railways in Pakistan